Natural Bridge Park near Natural Bridge, Alabama, is park in Winston County, Alabama, that has been open since 1954. The current owners are Jim and Barbara Denton.

The park includes picnic accommodations, an artesian well which supplies drinking fountains, a gift shop featuring hand-crafted items, 27 varieties of fern, a variety of hemlock which dates back to the Ice Age and a 30-minute nature trail.

This bridge is the longest natural bridge east of the Rocky Mountains in North America.

Downhill from the natural bridge is an outcropping of rock, presenting the image of a large American Indian head, in the right profile view, similar to that of an old American Indian Head nickel (see photo).

As of 2015, admission cost $3.50 for adults. Because of insurance concerns, visitors are not allowed to walk over the bridge, but instead, they view it while walking underneath.

The park is open from 8:00 A.M. until sunset seven days a week.

History
The natural bridge formation dates back about 200 million years. It was formed by water erosion of the weaker sandstone away from the stronger stone bridge spans, creating an erosion feature:  natural-bridge.

The park itself opened in 1954 to the public. It has long been known that the Creek Indians lived in this area, and they probably used the bridge-cave enclosure for shelter. Downhill from the bridge is the image of an Indian stone head; the origin of this formation is unknown.

This location was formerly known as "Lodi."

See also
 Natural Bridge (Virginia)

Notes

References
 Alisa Beckwith, "Natural Bridge History", "Small-Town Pride in Natural Bridge", from The Tuscaloosa News, Tuscaloosa, AL, February 10, 2002, webpage: geocities-NatBridge.
 Ettractions.com, "Natural Bridge of Alabama", 2008.

External links
 Photos of "Natural Bridge, Alabama"
 Photos of Natural Bridge
 

Natural arches of Alabama
Protected areas of Winston County, Alabama
Parks in Alabama
Landforms of Winston County, Alabama